James Tyler (born August 9, 1960) is an American bobsledder. He competed in the two man and the four man events at the 1984 Winter Olympics.

References

External links
 

1960 births
Living people
American male bobsledders
Olympic bobsledders of the United States
Bobsledders at the 1984 Winter Olympics
Bobsledders from Chicago